This article is a list of communes in France (metropolitan territory and overseas departments and regions) with over 20,000 inhabitants as of January 2019. As of January 2019, there were 473 communes with population over 20,000, 280 communes with population over 30,000, 129 communes with population over 50,000 and 42 communes with population over 100,000. All figures reflect the municipal population (French: population municipale), meaning people who have their usual residence in the commune, excluding population counted apart. The population of the matching Urban unit is usually several time that of its central commune. Populations as of 2006 and 2013 are also shown. Communes in the overseas territories are listed in a separate table below.

List

Overseas territories
For the overseas territories the legal populations sources are:

 Saint-Pierre-et-Miquelon: 2019 census
 Saint-Barthélemy: 2019 census
 Saint-Martin: 2019 census
 French Polynesia: 2017 census
 Wallis and Futuna: 2018 census
 New Caledonia: 2019 census

See also
Urban area (France)
Urban unit (including a list of "urban units" with more than 200,000 inhabitants)
Lists of communes of France
List of cities in Europe  by country

References

France
France

France